The Battle of the Wilderness, was fought around Locust Grove, Virginia, on May 5 through May 7, 1864, during the Overland Campaign in the American Civil War. Nearly 30,000 soldiers, when combining counts for both sides, were killed, wounded, or captured. The battle marked Lieutenant General Ulysses S. Grant's first appearance in a battle in the war's Eastern Theater.

Twenty Union Army enlisted men and three officers were awarded the Medal of Honor for acts of valor during the battle, which ended inconclusively when the Union army moved further south. All of the recipients were from the infantry, although cavalry were present. With one exception, all of the awards were for actions on the first two days of the battle. In two cases, extra action places were listed in addition to the Battle of the Wilderness.

Background
The Battle of the Wilderness was the first battle in Union Army Lieutenant General Ulysses S. Grant's Overland Campaign. The objective in this campaign was to eliminate Confederate Army General Robert E. Lee's Army of Northern Virginia. It was fought in a dense woods known as "The Wilderness", located in Virginia's Orange and Spotsylvania counties—including the small community of Locust Grove. Over 160,000 soldiers were engaged in the battle, and most of the fighting occurred on May 5 and May 6. Combined casualties were nearly 30,000. Although Grant withdrew from the battlefield (normally, defeated armies withdraw), he moved south where his infantry engaged Lee again at the Battle of Spotsylvania and his cavalry fought Confederate cavalry in the Battle of Todd's Tavern.

The Medal of Honor was created during the American Civil War and is the highest military decoration presented by the United States government to a member of its armed forces. The recipient must have distinguished themselves at the risk of their own life above and beyond the call of duty in action against an enemy of the United States. A search for "Wilderness" under the National Park Service's Medal of Honor database returns 23 recipients, including two captains and a colonel. Two soldiers have multiple places listed. In the case of Sergeant Abraham Cohn, actions at the Battle of the Wilderness and at the Siege of Petersburg are mentioned in his citation. The citation for James Madison Cutts is for triple service. It says "Gallantry in actions", and his Medal of Honor Action Place is Wilderness, Spotsylvania and Petersburg, Virginia.

Recipients

Notes

Footnotes

Citations

References

 

 

Battle of the Wilderness
Medal